Redstone Creek or Red Stone Creek may refer to:

Redstone Creek (Pennsylvania)
Redstone Creek (South Dakota)
Red Stone Creek (South Dakota)